Portrait of Muhammad Dervish Khan is a 1788 oil-on-canvas portrait painting by Elisabeth Vigee-Lebrun. It was sold by Sotheby's for US$7,185,900 in 2019.

It featured in the 2004 exhibition Encounters: the Meeting of Asia and Europe 1500-1800 at the Victoria and Albert Museum where it first received international attention as an unusually monumental portrait of a man from Mysore. Muhammad Dervish Khan was one of three ambassadors to the French court sent by Tipu Sultan. The portrait was never sold, though Vigée Le Brun fled Paris and left it behind when the city was mobbed.

Provenance
The portrait of Mahomet Dervisch-Kam, premier ambassadeur de Typpo-Sultan was shown in the Paris salon of 1789 in her absence, along with an even taller monumental portrait of Mahomet Usman-Kam, second ambassadeur de Typpo-Sultan that she painted (whereabouts unknown). Both paintings were admired greatly, partly because the ambassadors themselves had made quite a spectacle the year before. All three ambassadors returned to India without achieving the sought-for alliance and their heads were chopped off by the sultan, giving both paintings even more allure for their grim symbolism.

References

 Sotheby's auction record , 30 January 2019
 The Volatile Saga behind Elisabeth-Louise Vigée Le Brun's Portrait of India's Ambassador to France Sotheby's blog, 10 January 2019

Paintings by Élisabeth Vigée Le Brun
Portraits of men
1788 paintings